Mario Ančić and Julian Knowle were the defending champions.   Ančić did not participate this year.  Knowle partnered with Jürgen Melzer, losing in the first round.

Andrei Pavel and Alexander Waske won in the final 6–4, 6–2, against Alexander Peya and Björn Phau.

Seeds

Draw

Draw

External links
Draw

2006 ATP Tour
2006 BMW Open